Shtamë Pass is a mountainous passage close to the village of Selitë, Mat District, Albania. It resides in the Shtamë Pass National Park, and located within the way between Krujë and Burrel, being closer to the first one.

See also
Tragedy of Qafë Shtama

References

Mountain passes of Albania